Luciano Darderi (born 14 February 2002) is an Italian tennis player.

Darderi has a career high ATP singles ranking of World No. 168 achieved on the 17 October 2022. He also has a career high doubles ranking of World No. 104 achieved on 8 August 2022.

Darderi has won 4 ATP Challenger doubles titles.

He made his ATP debut at the Mexican Open following the withdrawal of top seed Carlos Alcaraz.

Future and Challenger finals

Singles: 3 (2–3)

Doubles: 7 (4–3)

References

External links
 
 

2002 births
Living people
Italian male tennis players
21st-century Italian people